Aggressive Measures is the fourth studio album by Dutch death metal band Sinister. It was released on 16 October 1998 through Nuclear Blast Records. This album was featured a new line-up which is Eric de Windt as vocalist and Alex Paul as bassist. Originally the band wanted Wes Benscoter to create another cover but he was busy with other commitments.

Track listing
All music and lyrics by Sinister.

Personnel
Sinister
Eric de Windt – Vocals
Alex Paul – Bass
Bart van Wallenberg – Guitars
Aad Kloosterwaard – Drums

Production
Klarsicht – Layout
Thomas Ewerhard – Cover art
Hans Pieters – Engineering
Vincent Dijkers – Engineering, Producer
Angelique Van Woerkom – Photography

References

1998 albums
Sinister (band) albums
Nuclear Blast albums